Eupithecia chiricahuata is a moth in the  family Geometridae. It is found in Arizona (Chiricahua Mountains).

The wingspan is about 21 mm.

References

Moths described in 1944
chiricahuata
Moths of North America